Flow of funds accounts are a system of interrelated balance sheets for a nation, calculated periodically. There are two types of balance sheets: those showing
 The aggregate assets and liabilities for financial and nonfinancial sectors, and
 What sectors issue and hold financial assets (instruments) of a given type.
The sectors and instruments are listed below.

These balance sheets measure levels of assets and liabilities. From each balance sheet a corresponding flows statement can be derived by subtracting the levels data for the preceding period from the data for the current period. (In the statistical analysis of time series, this operation is known as "first differencing.") The change in a level item between two adjacent periods is known as a "fund flow"; hence the name for these accounts.

Main topics covered in the FF accounts
 Total debt broken down by issuer and holder
 Connection to national accounts, and derivation of measures of aggregate saving
 Fund flows originating in each sector
 Levels:
 Assets and liabilities for broad sectors and for specific financial sectors
 Sectors issuing and holding instruments of a given class
 Miscellaneous aggregate financial data

Organization of the flow of funds accounts of the US
The flow of funds (FOF) accounts of the United States are prepared by the Flow of Funds section of the Board of Governors of the Federal Reserve System, and published quarterly in a publication called the Z.1 Statistical Release.  Current and historical releases available in pdf, csv, or xml format. Data frequency is annual from yearend 1945 and quarterly beginning in 1952Q1. Detailed interactive documentation  is also available.

The flow of funds accounts follow naturally from double-entry bookkeeping; every financial asset is also a liability of some domestic or foreign human entity. A fundamental fact about any economic sector is its balance sheet, a breakdown of its physical and financial assets, and of its liabilities. The only physical assets noted in the FF accounts are those of private nonfinancial sectors.

Broad structure of the US economy
Nonfinancial sectors:
 Households and nonprofit organizations
 Nonfinancial firms
 Corporations, farms excepted
 Unincorporated firms, farms excepted
 Farms
 Government
 Federal
 State & local
 Rest of the world (foreign sector)
Financial sector:
 Firms
 Instruments

Firms

Instruments (asset types)

Organisation of the flow of funds accounts of the UK

The UK flow of funds accounts are prepared by the Office for National Statistics in a series of matrices. The first tables will be published in Blue Book 2014, to be released in September 2014. They contain the sectors and instruments shown below:

Sectors

 Public Corporations
 Private non-Financial Corporations
 Monetary Financial Institutions
 Other Financial Institutions
 Insurance Corporations and Pension Funds
 Central Government
 Local Government
 Households and NPISH
 UK total economy
 Rest of the World

Financial Instruments

Monetary Gold and Special Drawing Rights

Currency and Deposits
 Currency
 Transferable Deposits
 With UK MFIs
 With Rest of the World MFIs
Other deposits

Debt securities
 Short term debt securities issued
 by UK Central Government
 by UK Local Government
 by UK MFIs
 MMIs by other UK residents
 MMIs by rest of the world
 Long term debt securities issued
 by UK Central Government
 by UK Local Government
 Medium term bonds by UK MFIs
 Medium and long-term bonds by other UK residents
 Long term bonds by rest of the world

Loans
 Short-term loans
 by UK MFIs
 by ROW MFIs
 Long-term loans
 Direct Investment loans
 Secured on dwellings
 Finance leasing
 Other long-term loans by UK residents
 Other long-term loans by rest of the world

Equity and investment fund shares/units
 Shares and other equity, excluding mutual funds shares
 Listed UK shares
 Unlisted UK shares
 Other UK equity
 UK shares and bonds issued by other UK residents
 Shares and other equity issued by the rest of the world
 Investment fund shares/units
 UK investment funds' shares
 Rest of the world mutual funds' shares

Insurance technical reserves
 Non-life insurance technical reserves
 Life insurance and annuity entitlements
 Pension schemes
 Provisions for calls under standardised guarantees

Financial derivates and employee stock options

 of which; Financial Derivatives

Other accounts payable / receivable

See also
 National accounts

External links
 Z.1 Release—Flow of Funds Accounts of the United States: Current, 1996 - present, All historical 
 Federal Reserve Board: Data Download Program 
 Federal Reserve Board: Flow of Funds Guide
 Federal Reserve Bank of St. Louis FRASER: Z.1

Central banks
Macroeconomic indicators